Swanpool, near Braunton, Devon, England, is a Site of Special Scientific Interest (SSSI) managed by the Devon Wildlife Trust as a nature reserve. It is a small area of coastal grassland and marsh.

Swanpool Marsh nature reserve forms part of the Braunton-Swanpool coastal marshland SSSI. Devon Wildlife Trust purchased it in 1988. Because it is close to sea level and poorly drained, the water table is at or near the surface for much of the year.

References
 Devon Wildlife Trust website page on Swanpool

Sites of Special Scientific Interest in Devon
Wetlands of England
Braunton